The 2022 Italian Basketball Cup, known as the Frecciarossa Final Eight 2022 for sponsorship reasons, was the 54th edition of Italy's national cup tournament. The competition is managed by the Lega Basket for LBA clubs. The tournament was played from 10 to 16 February 2022 in Pesaro, at the end of the first half of the 2021–22 LBA season.

References

External links

2021–22 in Italian basketball
Italian Basketball Cup
Italian Basketball Cup